Maurice Blood (15 February 1870 – 31 March 1940) was a British sport shooter, who competed in the 1908 Summer Olympics.

In the 1908 Olympics he won a bronze medal in the 1000 yard free rifle event, was fourth in the single-shot running deer event and the double-shot running deer event and finished 11th in the 300 metre free rifle event.

References

External links
profile

1870 births
1940 deaths
British male sport shooters
Olympic shooters of Great Britain
Shooters at the 1908 Summer Olympics
Olympic bronze medallists for Great Britain
Olympic medalists in shooting
Medalists at the 1908 Summer Olympics
20th-century British people